Eupithecia bryanti is a moth in the family Geometridae first described by Taylor in 1906. It is found from Alaska, the Yukon Territory, Alberta and British Columbia, through Washington, Oregon, Montana, Idaho, Wyoming and Utah to California.

Adults have been recorded on wing from April to August.

References

Moths described in 1906
bryanti
Moths of North America